Zeit der Wünsche is a 2005 two-part German television film directed by Rolf Schübel.

Cast
Erhan Emre - Mustafa
Lale Yavaş - Melike
Tim Seyfi - Kadir
Hilmi Sözer - Yasar
Neshe Demir - Mustafa's sister
 - Ursula
İdil Üner - Hamife
Dorka Gryllus - Esra

References

External links

2005 films
German television films
Films set in West Germany
Das Erste original programming